Hobiţa may refer to several villages in Romania:

 Hobiţa, a village in Peștișani Commune, Gorj County
 Hobiţa, a village in Pui Commune, Hunedoara County

See also 
 Hoban (surname)